Bernath is a surname. Notable people with the surname include:

 Antonia Bernath (born 1985), English actress, voiceover artist and singer
 Aurél Bernáth (1895–1982), Hungarian painter and art theorist
 Csaba Bernáth (born 1979), Hungarian footballer
 Eitan Bernath (born 2002), American celebrity chef
 István Bernáth (born 1989), Hungarian professional boxer
 Ľubomír Bernáth (born 1985), Slovak football forward
 Ľuboš Bernáth (born 1977), Slovak composer and music educator
 Willy Bernath (1914–1991), Swiss cross-country skier
 Yisroel Bernath, Canadian-American Hassidic rabbi